"I Don't Wanna Live Forever", alternatively titled "I Don't Wanna Live Forever (Fifty Shades Darker)", is a song recorded by English singer Zayn and American singer-songwriter Taylor Swift for the soundtrack to the 2017 film Fifty Shades Darker. It was written by Swift, Sam Dew, and its producer Jack Antonoff. The single was released on December 9, 2016, by Republic Records to international commercial success. "I Don't Wanna Live Forever" is a sultry electro-R&B and electropop ballad that sees Zayn and Swift exchange romantic overtures. Its accompanying music video was released on January 27, 2017.

Upon release, "I Don't Wanna Live Forever" received positive reviews from music critics, who praised the duo's vocal performances. Debuting at number six on the US Billboard Hot 100, the song eventually rose to its peak of number two, becoming Zayn's second top-five hit and Swift's eleventh on the chart, and the highest-peaking song from the Fifty Shades franchise. It topped the charts in Sweden, while reaching the top-five region in several other countries. In the US, the song became one of the top-ten best selling singles of 2016. As of June 2018, it is certified 4× Platinum by the Recording Industry Association of America for selling over 4 million units in the country. "I Don't Wanna Live Forever" is the best-selling western single in Chinese history. The song is certified Diamond in Brazil and France, and has received several platinum and multi-platinum certifications globally.

At the 60th Annual Grammy Awards, "I Don't Wanna Live Forever" received a nomination for Best Song Written for Visual Media. It won the Best Collaboration at the 2017 MTV Video Music Awards, Best Collaboration of the Year at the 2017 MTV Millennial Awards and an iHeartRadio Titanium Award for amassing one billion spins.

Composition 
"I Don't Wanna Live Forever" is an electro-R&B and electropop ballad. On the track, the pair trade "romantic overtures", while Zayn uses a falsetto on parts of the song, and Swift ponders what the relationship means.

"I Don't Wanna Live Forever" is written in the key of A minor and moves at a tempo of 118 beats per minute in common time.  The song follows a chord progression of F–C–G–Am–F–C–G–G–Am, and the vocals span two octaves, from E3 to E5.

Critical reception 
"I Don't Wanna Live Forever" received highly positive reviews from music critics. Nolan Feenery of Entertainment Weekly gave it a B+ rating: "Welcome to Taylor Swift's Sexy Side." He also praised the vocals of both artists. Lucas Villa of AXS thought the song was not as sexy as Ellie Goulding's "Love Me like You Do" or The Weeknd's "Earned It", writing, "Despite the neutered lyricism, Zayn saves the day and manages to maneuver his most magnificent performance to date." In June 2022, Insider ranked "I Don't Wanna Live Forever" as Swift's second best soundtrack song, only behind "Safe & Sound".

Commercial performance 
The song upon release was available only on iTunes and Tidal. It was not serviced on Spotify upon launch but was later added the following week. In the United States, it sold 188,000 in its first week, in addition to a 25 million radio audience and 3 million streams. It debuted at number six on the Billboard Hot 100. It is Zayn's second top 10 solo single and Taylor Swift's 20th top 10, making her the 16th artist and sixth woman to achieve this. It debuted at number one on the Billboard Digital Song Sales chart, as Zayn's fourth song (second solo song) and Swift's eleventh song to top the chart, tying Swift with Katy Perry for the second-most in the chart's history, behind Rihanna. It is also Zayn's second number-one on the Digital Songs chart in 2016, making him one of only two artists to top the chart with two songs that year, along with Drake. The song later reached a new peak of number two on the Hot 100, but was held off the top spot by Ed Sheeran's "Shape of You" with 109 million in radio audience and 25.7 million streams, becoming Zayn's second top-five single (as solo artist), Swift's 11th top-five single, and the highest-charting Fifty Shades single.  It reached over a million in sales by July 2017, and as of November 2017, it has sold 1.4 million copies in the United States. The song was the tenth best-selling song of 2017 in the United States, selling 1,108,000 copies in that year.

Across European charts, the song debuted at number one in Spain and Sweden, becoming Swift's first number-one single in both countries, while becoming Zayn's first number-one in Spain and his second number-one in Sweden. It was certified platinum there. It reached the top 10 in Austria, Belgium, Czech Republic, Denmark, Finland, France, Germany, Hungary, Ireland, Italy, Netherlands, Norway, Portugal, Scotland, Switzerland, and the United Kingdom.

Music video
The official music video of the song was released on January 27, 2017 through both Zayn and Taylor Swift's official YouTube account at the same time, and was later uploaded through the official Fifty Shades Vevo account as well. It was directed by Grant Singer and was produced by Saul Germaine. The music video uploaded on Malik's Vevo channel has more than 131 million views on YouTube as of December  2020. The music video uploaded on Swift's Vevo channel has more than 607 million views on YouTube as of December  2020. It was named the fourth best music video of 2017 by Vevo.

Synopsis
The video starts with Malik emerging from his car on a rainy night in London at the St. Pancras Renaissance London Hotel as the paparazzi take photos. As he enters the hotel, he starts singing his part,  and as the chorus begins he reaches the elevator with red lights, and then the camera pans over to another elevator with Swift singing her part and proceed to her hotel room. Malik sings the chorus in his room, and Swift pours some champagne in a glass. The rest of the video is the pair throwing objects like glasses, lamps and pillows across their rooms in anger with flashing blue and red lights. The pair are seen standing together, facing backs and singing the chorus together (Malik singing the chorus and Swift lip-syncing) and looking at each other. The video ends with Swift on her bed singing the last part of the song.

Live performances

Swift first performed "I Don't Wanna Live Forever" acoustically as a part of her set list for DirectTV's Super Saturday Night event on February 4, 2017. She later performed the song at KIIS FM's Jingle Ball in Los Angeles (December 1) and Capital FM's Jingle Bell Ball in London (December 10). She included the song in the B-stage portion at her second Manchester performance of her Reputation Stadium Tour.

Awards and nominations

Credits and personnel
Credits adapted from the liner notes of Fifty Shades Darker: Original Motion Picture Soundtrack.

Recording
 Recorded at Rough Coustumer Studio (Brooklyn, New York)
Zayn's vocals recorded at Record Plant (Los Angeles, California)
 Taylor Swift's vocals recorded at Rough Costumer Studios (Brooklyn, New York)
 Additional vocals engineered at NightBird Recording Studios (West Hollywood, California)
 Mixed at MixStar Studios (Virginia Beach, Virginia)
 Mastered at Sterling Sound Studios (New York City, New York)

Management
 Published by Sony/ATV Tree Publishing/Taylor Swift Music (BMI), Sony/ATV Songs LLC/Ducky Donathan Music (BMI), Sony/ATV Sonata/By the Chi Publishing (SESAC), UPG Music Publishing (BMI) and 1320 Music Publishing (SESAC)
 Zayn appears courtesy of RCA Records
 Taylor Swift appears courtesy of Big Machine Records

Personnel

 Zayn – lead vocals
 Taylor Swift – lead vocals, songwriter
 Jack Antonoff – producer, songwriter, instruments, vocals recording (Taylor Swift)
 Sam Dew – background vocals, songwriter
 Daniel Zaidenstadt – vocals recording (Zayn)
 Saltwives – additional vocals engineer
 Şerban Ghenea – mixing
 Tom Coyne – mastering

Charts

Weekly charts

Year-end charts

Certifications

Release history

See also
 List of number-one digital songs of 2016 (Canada)
 List of number-one digital songs of 2017 (U.S.)
 List of Billboard Hot 100 top 10 singles in 2017
Billboard Year-End Hot 100 singles of 2017
 List of number-one singles of the 2010s (Sweden)
 List of UK top 10 singles in 2017
 List of top 25 singles for 2017 in Australia
 List of top 10 singles in 2017 (Australia)

References

2010s ballads
2016 songs
2016 singles
Taylor Swift songs
Zayn Malik songs
Songs written by Taylor Swift
Songs written by Jack Antonoff
Songs written by Sam Dew
Song recordings produced by Jack Antonoff
Universal Music Group singles
Male–female vocal duets
Number-one singles in Sweden
Fifty Shades film music
Contemporary R&B ballads
Republic Records singles